Edward Joseph McAneeley (born November 7, 1950) is a Canadian former professional ice hockey player. He played three seasons in the National Hockey League with the California Golden Seals and one in the World Hockey Association with the Edmonton Oilers between 1972 and 1976. His twin brother, Bob McAneeley, also played hockey, and the two were teammates with Edmonton in 1975-76.

Career statistics

Regular season and playoffs

External links
 

1950 births
Living people
Baltimore Clippers players
Calgary Buffaloes players
California Golden Seals draft picks
California Golden Seals players
Canadian ice hockey defencemen
Edmonton Oil Kings (WCHL) players
Edmonton Oilers (WHA) players
Ice hockey people from British Columbia
Providence Reds players
Salt Lake Golden Eagles (CHL) players
Sportspeople from Cranbrook, British Columbia
Western International Hockey League players